Vladimir Nikolayevich Dolbonosov (8 April 1949 – 25 September 2014) was a Soviet professional footballer.

Club career
He made his debut in the Soviet Top League in 1967 for FC Dynamo Moscow.

Honours
 European Cup Winners' Cup 1971–72 finalist.
 Soviet Top League runner-up: 1967, 1970.
 Soviet Top League bronze: 1973.
 Soviet Cup winner: 1970.

References

1949 births
Footballers from Moscow
2014 deaths
Soviet footballers
FC Dynamo Moscow players
Association football defenders
Pakhtakor Tashkent FK players
Soviet Top League players